Michael Basinski (born 1950 in Buffalo, New York) is an American text, visual and sound poet. He was the curator of The Poetry Collection of the University Libraries, State University of New York at Buffalo. He performs as a solo poet and with the performance/sound ensemble, Bufffluxus.

Selected works

Poetry

Essays

References

Poets from New York (state)
Living people
1950 births